Stigmella belfrageella is a moth of the family Nepticulidae which is endemic to Texas.

Adults have been found in April.

External links

A taxonomic revision of the North American species of Stigmella (Lepidoptera: Nepticulidae)

Nepticulidae
Moths described in 1875
Endemic fauna of Texas
Moths of North America